Xanthopastis regnatrix, the Spanish moth or convict caterpillar, is a moth of the family Noctuidae. It occurs in the United States, where it is found from North Carolina to Texas and south to Florida. Strays have been recorded as far north as coastal New York, and inland as far north as Kentucky.

Taxonomy
The species known as Xanthopastis timais is now recognized as a species complex. The name for the species in eastern United States is Xanthopastis regnatrix (Type locality: Pennsylvania). This species name was used for the species by Kimball (1965), Wagner (2005) and Wagner et al. (in press).

Description
It is characterized by the black patch of scales on the forewing that completely surround the reniform and orbicular spots, the relatively small process on the inner surface of the right valve.

References

Glottulinae
Moths of North America
Moths of the Caribbean
Moths of Cuba
Lepidoptera of Jamaica
Moths described in 1863